Ashin Jinarakkhita (23 January 1923 – 18 April 2002), born Tee Boan-an 戴滿安 was an Indonesian-born Chinese who revived Buddhism in Indonesia. He was also known as Bhante Ashin, Tizheng Lao Heshang 體正老和尚, Teh-ching, Sukong 師公 (Grandmaster), and The Flying Monk.

Biography

Youth and early career
Jinarakkhita was born in Bogor, West Java on 23 January 1923 as Tee Boan-an 戴滿安, the third son of The Hong Gie and Tan Sep Moy. 
According to Juangari, as a young boy Tee Boan-an was already interested in yoga and "mystic powers". As a boy, he met a Theosophist from the Netherlands, who encouraged him to read "The Ancient Wisdom" and "The Secret Doctrines". When he was a teenager, Tee Boan-an practiced meditation at Gede Mountain and Salak Mountain, and visited "virtuous people" and Viharas to gain spiritual knowledge.

After attending the HBS at Jakarta and the Technical School in Bandung, he left in 1946 for the Netherlands to study chemistry at Groningen University. There he also continued his interest in Theosophy. He also learnt Pali and Sanskrit languages from Dr. Van Der Leeuw, and acquired fluency in English, German, French, and Dutch. During holidays, he went to France, where he had the opportunity to attend lectures by Jiddu Krishnamurti.

In 1951 he returned to Indonesia, where he worked as a teacher at several secondary schools in Jakarta, but also took an active interest in religion.

Buddhist ordination

Tee Boan-an became president of the Indonesian Sam Kauw Union as well as the vice-president of the central committee of the Indonesian Theosophy Youth. Buddhism was reintroduced in Indonesia in the beginning of the 20th century by the Theosophical Society, which played a central role in the popularisation of Buddhism in the west, and the revival of Buddhism in Sri Lanka. In Indonesia the Theosophical Society found adherents among the Dutch colonials, Chinese immigrants, and Indonesian noblemen. Buddhism spread in the form of Theravada and Mahayana. Theravadin Buddhists had contacts with Buddhist Orders in Sri Lanka, Burma and Thailand, while Chinese Mahayana priests from China were invited by the Indonesian-Chinese Buddhist communities.

Tee Boan-an received ordination as a Mahayana Ch'an novice monk on 29 July 1953, and received the name Tizheng 體正 (Te Cheng) from the Chinese Mahayana priest Benqing (Pen Ching/Pen Cheng) Lao Heshang, from the Guanghua Monastery in Putian, China.<ref group=web name="Braak2015">[http://www.vriendenvanboeddhisme.nl/2015/china.html Andre van der Braak, Vijf bezoeken aan China verder] , Vrienden van het Boeddhisme, januari 2015]</ref> Eventually, Tizheng received dharma transmission from Benqing.

After the Communists took over power in China in 1949, Buddhist monasteries were closed in China, and Indonesia tried to diminish Chinese influences in Indonesia. For these reasons, further Ch'an-training in China was problematic, 
and Benqing sent Tizheng to Burma in 1953, where he practiced Satipatthana Meditation under Mahasi Sayadaw. Tizheng was ordained as a Theravada monk in 1954, and received the name Ashin Jinarakkhita. The same year he returned to Indonesia,

Buddhist Revival
Jinarakkhita was instrumental in the revival of Buddhism in Indonesia. He realised that Buddhism had to adapt to Indonesian culture to survive; otherwise it would remain a foreign "fremdkörper".

In 1955 Jinarakkhita formed the first Indonesian Buddhist lay organisation, Persaudaraan Upasaka Upasika Indonesia (PUUI). In 1957, the PUUI was integrated into the Indonesian Buddhist Association (Perhimpunan Buddhis Indonesia, Perbudi), in which both Theravada and Mahayana priesthood were united. Nowadays, the PUUI is called Majelis Buddhayana Indonesia (MBI).

In 1960 Jinarakkhita established the Sangha Suci Indonesia, as a monastic organisation. In 1963 the name was changed to Maha Sangha of Indonesia, and in 1974 the name was change into Sangha Agung Indonesia. It is a community of monastics from the Theravada, Mahayana and Tantrayana traditions.

In 1965, after a coup-attempt, Buddhist organisations had to comply with the first principle of the Indonesian state ideology, Pancasila, the belief in one supreme God. All organisations that doubted or denied the existence of God were outlawed. this posed a problem for Indonesian Buddhism, which was solved by Jinarakkhita by presenting nibbana as the Theravada "God", and Adi-Buddha, the primaeval Buddha of the region's previous Mantrayana Buddhism, as the Mahayana "God". According to Jinarakkhita, the concept of Adi Buddha was found in the tenth-century Javanese Buddhist text Sang Hyang Kamhayanikan.

Another important factor in the Buddhist Revival was the use of a new category of lay Buddhist teachers. Those were older Buddhists without a formal dharma transmission or authorisation, but with a lot of life-experience. Those elder teachers were sanctioned by Jinarakkhita, and instituted new meditation-centers, and organised meetings and lectures.

Death
Jinarakkhita died on Thursday 18 April 2002 in Pluit Hospital, North Jakarta. His ashes and relics were brought back to Sakyavanaram Temple at Cipendawa Cliff, Pacet, Cianjur (between Jakarta and Bandung), West Java, where Jinarakkhita lived.

Teachings
Jinarakkhita had a liberal teaching on Buddhism. According to Jinarakkhita, orang suci ("saints") can be found everywhere, and religious experience is personal and unique. Each person has to pursue his or her own path. In his teachings he often quoted non-Buddhists, such as Ranggawarsita, and he admired Sai Baba.

Love, as represented by Guanyin, is essential:

Students
Jinarakkhita had students and followers in both Indonesia and other countries. One of them is Ton Lathouwers, a Dutch lay student who received dharma transmission in the Rinzai-lineage in 1987, and founded the Maha Karuna Ch'an organisation in the Netherlands.

See also

 Buddhism in Indonesia
 Vihara Buddhagaya Watugong
 Vipassana Movement
 Mahasi Sayadaw
 Guanghua Temple
 Parwati Soepangat
 Buddhism in the Netherlands
 Sanghyang Adi Buddha

Notes

References

Sources

Published sources

 
 
 
 
 
   
 
 
 
 
 
 
 
 
 

Web-sources

Further reading
 Ton Lathouwers, More than anyone can do. VU University Press (forthcoming)
 Charles Luk (Lu K'uan Yü), Chan and Zen Teaching''

External links
 Buddhayana (English) 
 Buddhayana.org (Indonesian)
 ashinjinarakkhita.or (Indonesian)

1923 births
2002 deaths
Indonesian Buddhists
Indonesian Buddhist monks
Indonesian religious leaders
Chan Buddhist monks
Indonesian people of Chinese descent
People from Bogor
20th-century Buddhist monks